The Stock Exchange of Thailand, or SET, is the only stock exchange in Thailand. From 2015 to June 2020 it was the biggest IPO market in Southeast Asia in terms of accumulated raised fund at USD 17.8 billion (THB 598.0147 billion). It is also the region’s most active bourse for 10 consecutive years with daily trading turnover normally exceeding USD 2 billion.

In recent years, the number of market participants has risen sharply: trading accounts has increased almost 10 times from 2008 to 2022. Based on the number of investors, about 3% of people in Thailand participate in the stock market.

SET index is the oldest and the most cited equity index in Thailand. It made intraday all-time high at 1852.51 on 27 February 2018, surpassing the previous high of 1789.16 on 5 January 1994.

SET has stricter price regulations than some other exchanges, normally disallowing stock prices to rise or drop more than 30% in a day.

Overview  
The exchange has 2 markets for listed companies: SET and mai (Market for Alternative Investment) the latter of which is for small and medium enterprises.

There are 818 listed companies as of 15 March 2023: 614 companies on the main exchange and 204 on mai.

Apart from common stocks, investors can trade other types of securities including warrant, derivative warrant (DW), depositary receipt (DR), exchange-traded fund (ETF), property fund (PF)/ real estate investment trust (REIT) and infrastructure fund. The exchange also runs a separate market for derivatives.

As of August 2021, the Thai bourse attracted investors from 124 countries, up from 116 the
previous year. The top ten nationalities’ holdings of Thai stocks amounted to US$147.5 billion (THB 4.77 trillion),
accounting for 93.7 percent of all foreign stock ownership. The rank of the first seven nationalities
remained unchanged from the previous year: the UK, Singapore, Hong Kong, Switzerland, the
US, Japan and Mauritius.

There has been growing interest in overseas investment among domestic investors. The US, China (including Hong Kong) and Vietnam are among the most popular, followed by Europe and India. Currently, the exchange has no foreign listing but ones can invest overseas by buying DR (depository receipt) which has been launched since 2018 as well as ETF.

To attract foreign investors and encourage cross-investment within ASEAN, exchanges in the region co-operate to facilitate investing in Indonesia, Malaysia, the Philippines, Singapore, Thailand and Vietnam. Other ASEAN countries namely Cambodia, Laos and Myanmar also have exchanges with the exception of Brunei.

History

The Stock Exchange of Thailand 
A precursor Bangkok Stock Exchange was established in July 1962 as a private entity. It finally ceased operations in the early 1970s due to a lack of government support and limited interest and understanding of the equity market among populace.

In 1972, the Thai government took a step in creating a capital market. The changes extended government control and regulation over the operations of finance and securities companies, which until then had operated fairly freely. Then in May 1974, long-awaited legislation for the incorporation of SET was enacted to provide securities trading in order to promote savings and mobilize domestic capital. This was followed by revisions to the Revenue Code at the end of the year, allowing the investment of savings in the capital market. By 1975, the basic legislative framework was in place and on 30 April 1975, the Securities Exchange of Thailand officially started trading. On 1 January 1991 the name was formally changed to the Stock Exchange of Thailand (SET).

Thailand Futures Exchange (TFEX), a subsidiary of the Stock Exchange of Thailand (SET), was established on 17 May 2004 as a derivatives exchange. On 28 April 2006 SET50 Index Futures was launched as the first product. Single Stock Futures was first launched on 24 November 2008. Derivative warrant was launched on 9 July 2009.

In 2008, the Securities and Exchange Commission, Thailand together with the central bank allowed domestic individual investors to invest abroad directly for the first time through a Thai brokerage. Previously, only institutions could invest overseas.></ref>

Trading

SET began fully computerized trading in April 1991.
The system allows brokers to advertise their buy or sell interests by announcing bid or offer prices. Members may then deal directly with each other, either on behalf of their clients or for themselves. Prices may be adjusted during the negotiation; hence, the effective executed price may not be the same as that advertised and may not follow the price spread rules. After concluding negotiations, dealers must send details of the results for recording purposes.

Trading through mobile device began in 2010 with the launch of settrade streaming for iPhone according to SET's 2010 annual report (page 36).

Indices and listed securities
There is no index which combines both SET and mai. Some original mai companies have been listed in SET.

In the first day of trading, there were 8 listed companies and 5 of them still remain: BBL, BJC, DUSIT, SCC, and TCAP.

There are 10 DR as of 29 Sep 2022: 
1. E1VFVN3001 which tracks VN30 Index
2. BABA80
3. FUEVFVND01
4. TENCENT80
5. NDX100 which tracks Nasdaq-100
6. STAR5001
7. XIAOMI80
8. BYDCOM80
9. AAPL80X
10.TSLA80X

CHINA is an ETF which tracks CSI 300 Index. So far it is the only ETF which invests overseas.

low of SET Index

SET Index was at a peak of 924.70 in November 2007 before the subprime crisis.

Tick sizes

References

 
Economy of Thailand
Buildings and structures in Bangkok
Stock exchanges in Thailand
Financial services companies established in 1975
1975 establishments in Thailand
Companies based in Bangkok
Stock exchanges in Southeast Asia